Marc Bertrán Vilanova (born 22 May 1982) is a Spanish professional footballer who plays as a right back.

He appeared in 119 La Liga games over the course of nine seasons, in representation of Espanyol, Cádiz, Tenerife and Osasuna. He added 203 and six goals in Segunda División, with five clubs.

Club career
Born in La Pobla de Segur, Lleida, Catalonia, Bertrán began playing football for local La Pobla de Segur as future FC Barcelona's Carles Puyol before him. He finished his grooming at RCD Espanyol's youth ranks and played once for the first team in 2001–02, going on to amass a further 16 La Liga appearances in the next two seasons combined; in the second part of the 2004–05 campaign, he served a relegation-ending loan spell at Córdoba CF in the second division.

Released in the summer of 2005, Bertrán split 2005–06 in the two major levels, with Cádiz CF and Lorca Deportiva CF. Subsequently, he moved to CD Tenerife, being an undisputed starter from the beginning; in his third year, he was a defensive cornerstone as the Canary Islands club returned to the top flight after seven years, starting in all of his 35 league appearances and scoring twice.

In 2009–10, as Tenerife were relegated in the last matchday, Bertrán appeared in 21 matches, netting in the penultimate round – a 2–2 home draw against UD Almería. Having started and finished the season in the starting eleven, however, he also missed almost four months of action after a dangerous challenge from Real Madrid's Royston Drenthe during a 0–3 away loss in late September.

Bertrán was again first-choice for Tenerife in the 2010–11 campaign, but the team suffered another relegation. In early June 2011, the 29-year-old agreed on a deal with CA Osasuna, thus returning to the top tier.

International career
In his only cap in the Spain under-21 side, on 10 October 2003, Bertrán played the entire 2–0 away victory over Armenia for the 2004 UEFA European Championship qualifiers.

References

External links

Stats and bio at Cadistas1910 

1982 births
Living people
People from Pallars Jussà
Sportspeople from the Province of Lleida
Spanish footballers
Footballers from Catalonia
Association football defenders
La Liga players
Segunda División players
Segunda División B players
RCD Espanyol B footballers
RCD Espanyol footballers
Córdoba CF players
Cádiz CF players
Lorca Deportiva CF footballers
CD Tenerife players
CA Osasuna players
Recreativo de Huelva players
CD Leganés players
Real Zaragoza players
Spain under-21 international footballers